The 1976 New Mexico Lobos football team was an American football team that represented the University of New Mexico in the Western Athletic Conference (WAC) during the 1976 NCAA Division I football season.  In their third season under head coach Bill Mondt, the Lobos compiled a 4–7 record (3–4 against WAC opponents) and were outscored by a total of 235 to 229.

Robin Cole and Dave Green were the team captains. The team's statistical leaders included Noel Mazzone with 1,427 passing yards, Mike Williams with 1,240 rushing yards and 66 points scored, Preston Dennard with 783 receiving yards.

Schedule

References

New Mexico
New Mexico Lobos football seasons
New Mexico Lobos football